Obi (also called Obira) is the main island in the Obi Islands group of Indonesia, south of the larger Halmahera in North Maluku. Its area is 2,542 km².

The island is eponymous to the Obi Island Birdwing, an endemic species of butterfly. Extensive logging on the island has reduced its habitat, making the species' conservation a concern.

In July 2016, provincial governor Abdul Ghani Kasuba successfully negotiated with the China-based Jinchun Group for the building of a nine-trillion rupiah nickel smelter on the island.

References

Islands of the Maluku Islands
Landforms of North Maluku